Marshal of the Russian Federation is the highest military rank of Russia, created in 1993 following the dissolution of the Soviet Union. It ranks immediately above Army general and Admiral of the fleet (also called Fleet Admiral in some English-language texts), and is considered the successor to the Soviet-era rank of Marshal of the Soviet Union.

A Marshal of the Russian Federation outranks Generals of the Army (four stars), Colonel-Generals (three stars), Lieutenant-Generals (two stars) and Major-Generals (one star). It is roughly equivalent to American General of the Army and the British Field Marshal.

The only officer so far to have held the rank was Igor Sergeyev, the former Minister of Defence, who had been elevated from the General of the Army of the Strategic Rocket Forces. Sergeyev was a Marshal of the Russian Federation from 1997 until his death in 2006.

The insignia for Marshal of the Russian Federation is similar to the one for the Marshal of the Soviet Union, with the Soviet emblem replaced by the Russian coat of arms. An officer who is given this rank would also wear the Marshal's star.

Rank insignia

See also
 Army ranks and insignia of the Russian Federation
 Marshal of the Soviet Union
 List of Russian field marshals

References

External links
 Federal Law No. 58-FZ from March 12, 1998 "On military duty and military service"  (in Russian)

Military ranks of Russia
Marshals